Anthony N. Discenzo (February 4, 1936 – February 11, 2007) was an American football tackle who played one season in the American Football League with the Boston Patriots and Buffalo Bills. He played college football at Michigan State University and attended Cathedral Latin High School in Cleveland, Ohio.

References

External links
Just Sports Stats

1936 births
2007 deaths
Players of American football from Cleveland
American football tackles
Michigan State Spartans football players
Boston Patriots players
Buffalo Bills players